Anxiety is an emotion which is characterized by an unpleasant state of inner turmoil and includes feelings of dread over anticipated events. Anxiety is different than fear in that the former is defined as the anticipation of a future threat whereas the latter is defined as the emotional response to a real threat. It is often accompanied by nervous behavior such as pacing back and forth, somatic complaints, and rumination.

Anxiety is a feeling of uneasiness and worry, usually generalized and unfocused as an overreaction to a situation that is only subjectively seen as menacing. It is often accompanied by muscular tension, restlessness, fatigue, inability to catch one's breath, tightness in the abdominal region, nausea, and problems in concentration. Anxiety is closely related to fear, which is a response to a real or perceived immediate threat (fight or flight response); anxiety involves the expectation of future threat including dread. People facing anxiety may withdraw from situations which have provoked anxiety in the past.

The emotion of anxiety can persist beyond the developmentally appropriate time-periods in response to specific events, and thus turning into one of the multiple anxiety disorders (e.g. generalized anxiety disorder, panic disorder). The difference between anxiety disorder (as mental disorder) and anxiety (as normal emotion), is that people with an anxiety disorder experience anxiety most of the days during approximately 6 months, or even during shorter time-periods in children. Anxiety disorders are among the most persistent mental problems and often last decades. Besides, strong percepts of anxiety exist within other mental disorders, e.g. obsessive-compulsive disorder, post-traumatic stress disorder.

Anxiety vs. fear
Anxiety is distinguished from fear, which is an appropriate cognitive and emotional response to a perceived threat. Anxiety is related to the specific behaviors of fight-or-flight responses, defensive behavior or escape. There is a false presumption that often circulates that anxiety only occurs in situations perceived as uncontrollable or unavoidable, but this is not always so. David Barlow defines anxiety as "a future-oriented mood state in which one is not ready or prepared to attempt to cope with upcoming negative events," and that it is a distinction between future and present dangers which divides anxiety and fear. Another description of anxiety is agony, dread, terror, or even apprehension. In positive psychology, anxiety is described as the mental state that results from a difficult challenge for which the subject has insufficient coping skills. 

Fear and anxiety can be differentiated into four domains: (1) duration of emotional experience, (2) temporal focus, (3) specificity of the threat, and (4) motivated direction. Fear is short-lived, present-focused, geared towards a specific threat, and facilitating escape from threat. On the other hand, anxiety is long-acting, future-focused, broadly focused towards a diffuse threat, and promoting excessive caution while approaching a potential threat and interferes with constructive coping.

Joseph E. LeDoux and Lisa Feldman Barrett have both sought to separate automatic threat responses from additional associated cognitive activity within anxiety.

Symptoms
Anxiety can be experienced with long, drawn-out daily symptoms that reduce quality of life, known as chronic (or generalized) anxiety, or it can be experienced in short spurts with sporadic, stressful panic attacks, known as acute anxiety. Symptoms of anxiety can range in number, intensity, and frequency, depending on the person. While almost everyone has experienced anxiety at some point in their life, most people do not develop long-term problems with anxiety.

Anxiety can induce several psychological pains (e.g. depression) or mental disorders, and may lead to self-harm or suicide (for which dedicated hotlines exist).

The behavioral effects of anxiety may include withdrawal from situations which have provoked anxiety or negative feelings in the past. Other effects may include changes in sleeping patterns, changes in habits, increase or decrease in food intake, and increased motor tension (such as foot tapping).

The emotional effects of anxiety may include "feelings of apprehension or dread, trouble concentrating, feeling tense or jumpy, anticipating the worst, irritability, restlessness, watching (and waiting) for signs (and occurrences) of danger, and, feeling like your mind's gone blank" as well as "nightmares/bad dreams, obsessions about sensations, déjà vu, a trapped-in-your-mind feeling, and feeling like everything is scary." It may include a vague experience and feeling of helplessness.

The cognitive effects of anxiety may include thoughts about suspected dangers, such as fear of dying: "You may ... fear that the chest pains are a deadly heart attack or that the shooting pains in your head are the result of a tumor or an aneurysm. You feel an intense fear when you think of dying, or you may think of it more often than normal, or can't get it out of your mind."

The physiological symptoms of anxiety may include:
Neurological, as headache, paresthesias, fasciculations, vertigo, or presyncope.
Digestive, as abdominal pain, nausea, diarrhea, indigestion, dry mouth, or bolus. Stress hormones released in an anxious state have an impact on bowel function and can manifest physical symptoms that may contribute to or exacerbate IBS.
Respiratory, as shortness of breath or sighing breathing.
Cardiac, as palpitations, tachycardia, or chest pain.
Muscular, as fatigue, tremors, or tetany.
Cutaneous, as perspiration, or itchy skin.
Uro-genital, as frequent urination, urinary urgency, dyspareunia, or impotence, chronic pelvic pain syndrome.

Types

There are various types of anxiety. Existential anxiety can occur when a person faces angst, an existential crisis, or nihilistic feelings. People can also face mathematical anxiety, somatic anxiety, stage fright, or test anxiety. Social anxiety refers to a fear of rejection and negative evaluation (being judged) by other people.

Existential

The philosopher Søren Kierkegaard, in The Concept of Anxiety (1844), described anxiety or dread associated with the "dizziness of freedom" and suggested the possibility for positive resolution of anxiety through the self-conscious exercise of responsibility and choosing. In Art and Artist (1932), the psychologist Otto Rank wrote that the psychological trauma of birth was the pre-eminent human symbol of existential anxiety and encompasses the creative person's simultaneous fear of – and desire for – separation, individuation, and differentiation.

The theologian Paul Tillich characterized existential anxiety as "the state in which a being is aware of its possible nonbeing" and he listed three categories for the nonbeing and resulting anxiety: ontic (fate and death), moral (guilt and condemnation), and spiritual (emptiness and meaninglessness). According to Tillich, the last of these three types of existential anxiety, i.e. spiritual anxiety, is predominant in modern times while the others were predominant in earlier periods. Tillich argues that this anxiety can be accepted as part of the human condition or it can be resisted but with negative consequences. In its pathological form, spiritual anxiety may tend to "drive the person toward the creation of certitude in systems of meaning which are supported by tradition and authority" even though such "undoubted certitude is not built on the rock of reality".

According to Viktor Frankl, the author of Man's Search for Meaning, when a person is faced with extreme mortal dangers, the most basic of all human wishes is to find a meaning of life to combat the "trauma of nonbeing" as death is near.

Depending on the source of the threat, psychoanalytic theory distinguishes the following types of anxiety:
 realistic
 neurotic
 moral

Test and performance

According to Yerkes-Dodson law, an optimal level of arousal is necessary to best complete a task such as an exam, performance, or competitive event. However, when the anxiety or level of arousal exceeds that optimum, the result is a decline in performance.

Test anxiety is the uneasiness, apprehension, or nervousness felt by students who have a fear of failing an exam. Students who have test anxiety may experience any of the following: the association of grades with personal worth; fear of embarrassment by a teacher; fear of alienation from parents or friends; time pressures; or feeling a loss of control. Sweating, dizziness, headaches, racing heartbeats, nausea, fidgeting, uncontrollable crying or laughing and drumming on a desk are all common. Because test anxiety hinges on fear of negative evaluation, debate exists as to whether test anxiety is itself a unique anxiety disorder or whether it is a specific type of social phobia. The DSM-IV classifies test anxiety as a type of social phobia.

While the term "test anxiety" refers specifically to students, many workers share the same experience with regard to their career or profession. The fear of failing at a task and being negatively evaluated for failure can have a similarly negative effect on the adult. Management of test anxiety focuses on achieving relaxation and developing mechanisms to manage anxiety.

Test anxiety remains a challenge for students and has considerable physiological and psychological impacts. The routine practice of slow, Device-Guided Breathing (DGB) is a
major component of behavioral treatments for anxiety conditions.

Stranger, social, and intergroup anxiety

Humans generally require social acceptance and thus sometimes dread the disapproval of others. Apprehension of being judged by others may cause anxiety in social environments.

Anxiety during social interactions, particularly between strangers, is common among young people. It may persist into adulthood and become social anxiety or social phobia. "Stranger anxiety" in small children is not considered a phobia. In adults, an excessive fear of other people is not a developmentally common stage; it is called social anxiety. According to Cutting, social phobics do not fear the crowd but the fact that they may be judged negatively.

Social anxiety varies in degree and severity. For some people, it is characterized by experiencing discomfort or awkwardness during physical social contact (e.g. embracing, shaking hands, etc.), while in other cases it can lead to a fear of interacting with unfamiliar people altogether. Those with this condition may restrict their lifestyles to accommodate the anxiety, minimizing social interaction whenever possible. Social anxiety also forms a core aspect of certain personality disorders, including avoidant personality disorder.

To the extent that a person is fearful of social encounters with unfamiliar others, some people may experience anxiety particularly during interactions with outgroup members, or people who share different group memberships (i.e., by race, ethnicity, class, gender, etc.). Depending on the nature of the antecedent relations, cognitions, and situational factors, intergroup contact may be stressful and lead to feelings of anxiety. This apprehension or fear of contact with outgroup members is often called interracial or intergroup anxiety.

As is the case with the more generalized forms of social anxiety, intergroup anxiety has behavioral, cognitive, and affective effects. For instance, increases in schematic processing and simplified information processing can occur when anxiety is high. Indeed, such is consistent with related work on attentional bias in implicit memory. Additionally recent research has found that implicit racial evaluations (i.e. automatic prejudiced attitudes) can be amplified during intergroup interaction. Negative experiences have been illustrated in producing not only negative expectations, but also avoidant, or antagonistic, behavior such as hostility. Furthermore, when compared to anxiety levels and cognitive effort (e.g., impression management and self-presentation) in intragroup contexts, levels and depletion of resources may be exacerbated in the intergroup situation.

Trait
Anxiety can be either a short-term "state" or a long-term personality "trait." Trait anxiety reflects a stable tendency across the lifespan of responding with acute, state anxiety in the anticipation of threatening situations (whether they are actually deemed threatening or not). A meta-analysis showed that a high level of neuroticism is a risk factor for development of anxiety symptoms and disorders. Such anxiety may be conscious or unconscious.

Personality can also be a trait leading to anxiety and depression and their persistence. Through experience, many find it difficult to collect themselves due to their own personal nature.

Choice or decision 
Anxiety induced by the need to choose between similar options is increasingly being recognized as a problem for individuals and for organizations. In 2004, Capgemini wrote: "Today we're all faced with greater choice, more competition and less time to consider our options or seek out the right advice."

In a decision context, unpredictability or uncertainty may trigger emotional responses in anxious individuals that systematically alter decision-making. There are primarily two forms of this anxiety type. The first form refers to a choice in which there are multiple potential outcomes with known or calculable probabilities. The second form refers to the uncertainty and ambiguity related to a decision context in which there are multiple possible outcomes with unknown probabilities.

Panic disorder

Panic disorder may share symptoms of stress and anxiety, but it is actually very different. Panic disorder is an anxiety disorder that occurs without any triggers. According to the U.S. Department of Health and Human Services, this disorder can be distinguished by unexpected and repeated episodes of intense fear. Someone with panic disorder will eventually develop constant fear of another attack and as this progresses it will begin to affect daily functioning and an individual's general quality of life. It is reported by the Cleveland Clinic that panic disorder affects 2 to 3 percent of adult Americans and can begin around the time of the teenage and early adult years. Some symptoms include: difficulty breathing, chest pain, dizziness, trembling or shaking, feeling faint, nausea, fear that you are losing control or are about to die. Even though they have these symptoms during an attack, the main symptom is the persistent fear of having future panic attacks.

Anxiety disorders

Anxiety disorders are a group of mental disorders characterized by exaggerated feelings of anxiety and fear responses. Anxiety is a worry about future events and fear is a reaction to current events. These feelings may cause physical symptoms, such as a fast heart rate and shakiness. There are a number of anxiety disorders: including generalized anxiety disorder, specific phobia, social anxiety disorder, separation anxiety disorder, agoraphobia, panic disorder, and selective mutism. The disorder differs by what results in the symptoms. People often have more than one anxiety disorder.

Anxiety disorders are caused by a complex combination of genetic and environmental factors. To be diagnosed, symptoms typically need to be present for at least six months, be more than would be expected for the situation, and decrease a person's ability to function in their daily lives. Other problems that may result in similar symptoms include hyperthyroidism, heart disease, caffeine, alcohol, or cannabis use, and withdrawal from certain drugs, among others.

Without treatment, anxiety disorders tend to remain. Treatment may include lifestyle changes, counselling, and medications. Counselling is typically with a type of cognitive behavioural therapy. Medications, such as antidepressants or beta blockers, may improve symptoms.

About 12% of people are affected by an anxiety disorder in a given year and between 12–30% are affected at some point in their life. They occur about twice as often in women than they do in men, and generally begin before the age of 25. The most common are specific phobia which affects nearly 12% and social anxiety disorder which affects 10% at some point in their life. They affect those between the ages of 15 and 35 the most and become less common after the age of 55. Rates appear to be higher in the United States and Europe.

Short- and long-term anxiety
Anxiety can be either a short-term "state" or a long-term "trait." Whereas trait anxiety represents worrying about future events, anxiety disorders are a group of mental disorders characterized by feelings of anxiety and fears.

Four ways to be anxious
In his book Anxious: the modern mind in the age of anxiety Joseph LeDoux examines four experiences of anxiety through a brain-based lens:

 In the presence of an existing or imminent external threat, you worry about the event and its implications for your physical and/or psychological well-being. When a threat signal occurs, it signifies either that danger is present or near in space and time or that it might be coming in the future. Nonconscious threats processing by the brain activates defensive survival circuits, resulting in changes in information processing in the brain, controlled in part by increases in arousal and behavioral and physiological responses in the body that then produce signals that feed back to the brain and complement the physiological changes there, intensifying them and extending their duration.
 When you notice body sensations, you worry about what they might mean for your physical and/or psychological well-being. The trigger stimulus does not have to be an external stimulus but can be an internal one, as some people are particularly sensitive to body signals.
 Thoughts and memories may lead to you to worry about your physical and/or psychological well-being. We do not need to be presence of an external or internal stimulus to be anxious. An episodic memory of a past trauma or of a panic attack in the past is sufficient to activate the defence circuits.
 Thoughts and memories may result in existential dread, such as worry about leading a meaningful life or the eventuality of death. Examples are contemplations of whether one's life has been meaningful, the inevitability of death, or the difficulty of making decisions that have a moral value. These do not necessarily activate defensive systems; they are more or less pure forms of cognitive anxiety.

Co-morbidity
Anxiety disorders often occur with other mental health disorders, particularly major depressive disorder, bipolar disorder, eating disorders, or certain personality disorders. It also commonly occurs with personality traits such as neuroticism. This observed co-occurrence is partly due to genetic and environmental influences shared between these traits and anxiety.

It is common for those with obsessive–compulsive disorder to experience anxiety. Anxiety is also commonly found in those who experience panic disorders, phobic anxiety disorders, severe stress, dissociative disorders, somatoform disorders, and some neurotic disorders.
Anxiety has also been linked to the experience of intrusive thoughts. Studies have revealed that individuals who experience high levels of anxiety (also known as clinical anxiety) are highly vulnerable to the experience of intense intrusive thoughts or psychological disorders that are characterised by intrusive thoughts.

Risk factors

Anxiety disorders are partly genetic, with twin studies suggesting 30-40% genetic influence on individual differences in anxiety. Environmental factors are also important. Twin studies show that individual-specific environments have a large influence on anxiety, whereas shared environmental influences (environments that affect twins in the same way) operate during childhood but decline through adolescence. Specific measured 'environments' that have been associated with anxiety include child abuse, family history of mental health disorders, and poverty. Anxiety is also associated with drug use, including alcohol, caffeine, and benzodiazepines (which are often prescribed to treat anxiety).

Neuroanatomy
Neural circuitry involving the amygdala (which regulates emotions like anxiety and fear, stimulating the HPA axis and sympathetic nervous system) and hippocampus (which is implicated in emotional memory along with the amygdala) is thought to underlie anxiety. People who have anxiety tend to show high activity in response to emotional stimuli in the amygdala. Some writers believe that excessive anxiety can lead to an overpotentiation of the limbic system (which includes the amygdala and nucleus accumbens), giving increased future anxiety, but this does not appear to have been proven.

Research upon adolescents who as infants had been highly apprehensive, vigilant, and fearful finds that their nucleus accumbens is more sensitive than that in other people when deciding to make an action that determined whether they received a reward. This suggests a link between circuits responsible for fear and also reward in anxious people. As researchers note, "a sense of 'responsibility', or self-agency, in a context of uncertainty (probabilistic outcomes) drives the neural system underlying appetitive motivation (i.e., nucleus accumbens) more strongly in temperamentally inhibited than noninhibited adolescents".

The gut-brain axis 
The microbes of the gut can connect with the brain to affect anxiety. There are various pathways along which this communication can take place. One is through the major neurotransmitters. The gut microbes such as Bifidobacterium and Bacillus produce the neurotransmitters GABA and dopamine, respectively. The neurotransmitters signal to the nervous system of the gastrointestinal tract, and those signals will be carried to the brain through the vagus nerve or the spinal system. This is demonstrated by the fact that altering the microbiome has shown anxiety- and depression-reducing effects in mice, but not in subjects without vagus nerves.

Another key pathway is the HPA axis, as mentioned above. The microbes can control the levels of cytokines in the body, and altering cytokine levels creates direct effects on areas of the brain such as the hypothalamus, the area that triggers HPA axis activity. The HPA axis regulates production of cortisol, a hormone that takes part in the body's stress response. When HPA activity spikes, cortisol levels increase, processing and reducing anxiety in stressful situations. These pathways, as well as the specific effects of individual taxa of microbes, are not yet completely clear, but the communication between the gut microbiome and the brain is undeniable, as is the ability of these pathways to alter anxiety levels.

With this communication comes the potential to treat anxiety. Prebiotics and probiotics have been shown to reduce anxiety. For example, experiments in which mice were given fructo- and galacto-oligosaccharide prebiotics and Lactobacillus probiotics have both demonstrated a capability to reduce anxiety. In humans, results are not as concrete, but promising.

Genetics
Genetics and family history (e.g. parental anxiety) may put an individual at increased risk of an anxiety disorder, but generally external stimuli will trigger its onset or exacerbation. Estimates of genetic influence on anxiety, based on studies of twins, range from 25 to 40% depending on the specific type and age-group under study. For example, genetic differences account for about 43% of variance in panic disorder and 28% in generalized anxiety disorder. Longitudinal twin studies have shown the moderate stability of anxiety from childhood through to adulthood is mainly influenced by stability in genetic influence. When investigating how anxiety is passed on from parents to children, it is important to account for sharing of genes as well as environments, for example using the intergenerational children-of-twins design.

Many studies in the past used a candidate gene approach to test whether single genes were associated with anxiety. These investigations were based on hypotheses about how certain known genes influence neurotransmitters (such as serotonin and norepinephrine) and hormones (such as cortisol) that are implicated in anxiety. None of these findings are well replicated, with the possible exception of TMEM132D, COMT and MAO-A. The epigenetic signature of BDNF, a gene that codes for a protein called brain derived neurotrophic factor that is found in the brain, has also been associated with anxiety and specific patterns of neural activity. and a receptor gene for BDNF called NTRK2 was associated with anxiety in a large genome-wide investigation. The reason that most candidate gene findings have not replicated is that anxiety is a complex trait that is influenced by many genomic variants, each of which has a small effect on its own. Increasingly, studies of anxiety are using a hypothesis-free approach to look for parts of the genome that are implicated in anxiety using big enough samples to find associations with variants that have small effects. The largest explorations of the common genetic architecture of anxiety have been facilitated by the UK Biobank, the ANGST consortium and the CRC Fear, Anxiety and Anxiety Disorders.

Medical conditions
Many medical conditions can cause anxiety. This includes conditions that affect the ability to breathe, like COPD and asthma, and the difficulty in breathing that often occurs near death. Conditions that cause abdominal pain or chest pain can cause anxiety and may in some cases be a somatization of anxiety; the same is true for some sexual dysfunctions. Conditions that affect the face or the skin can cause social anxiety especially among adolescents, and developmental disabilities often lead to social anxiety for children as well. Life-threatening conditions like cancer also cause anxiety.

Furthermore, certain organic diseases may present with anxiety or symptoms that mimic anxiety. These disorders include certain endocrine diseases (hypo- and hyperthyroidism, hyperprolactinemia), metabolic disorders (diabetes), deficiency states (low levels of vitamin D, B2, B12, folic acid), gastrointestinal diseases (celiac disease, non-celiac gluten sensitivity, inflammatory bowel disease), heart diseases, blood diseases (anemia), cerebral vascular accidents (transient ischemic attack, stroke), and brain degenerative diseases (Parkinson's disease, dementia, multiple sclerosis, Huntington's disease), among others.

Substance-induced
Several drugs can cause or worsen anxiety, whether in intoxication, withdrawal or as side effect. These include alcohol, tobacco, sedatives (including prescription benzodiazepines), opioids (including prescription pain killers and illicit drugs like heroin), stimulants (such as caffeine, cocaine and amphetamines), hallucinogens, and inhalants.

While many often report self-medicating anxiety with these substances, improvements in anxiety from drugs are usually short-lived (with worsening of anxiety in the long term, sometimes with acute anxiety as soon as the drug effects wear off) and tend to be exaggerated. Acute exposure to toxic levels of benzene may cause euphoria, anxiety, and irritability lasting up to 2 weeks after the exposure.

Psychological
Poor coping skills (e.g., rigidity/inflexible problem solving, denial, avoidance, impulsivity, extreme self-expectation, negative thoughts, affective instability, and inability to focus on problems) are associated with anxiety. Anxiety is also linked and perpetuated by the person's own pessimistic outcome expectancy and how they cope with feedback negativity. Temperament (e.g., neuroticism) and attitudes (e.g. pessimism) have been found to be risk factors for anxiety.

Cognitive distortions such as overgeneralizing, catastrophizing, mind reading, emotional reasoning, binocular trick, and mental filter can result in anxiety. For example, an overgeneralized belief that something bad "always" happens may lead someone to have excessive fears of even minimally risky situations and to avoid benign social situations due to anticipatory anxiety of embarrassment. In addition, those who have high anxiety can also create future stressful life events. Together, these findings suggest that anxious thoughts can lead to anticipatory anxiety as well as stressful events, which in turn cause more anxiety. Such unhealthy thoughts can be targets for successful treatment with cognitive therapy.

Psychodynamic theory posits that anxiety is often the result of opposing unconscious wishes or fears that manifest via maladaptive defense mechanisms (such as suppression, repression, anticipation, regression, somatization, passive aggression, dissociation) that develop to adapt to problems with early objects (e.g., caregivers) and empathic failures in childhood. For example, persistent parental discouragement of anger may result in repression/suppression of angry feelings which manifests as gastrointestinal distress (somatization) when provoked by another while the anger remains unconscious and outside the individual's awareness. Such conflicts can be targets for successful treatment with psychodynamic therapy. While psychodynamic therapy tends to explore the underlying roots of anxiety, cognitive behavioral therapy has also been shown to be a successful treatment for anxiety by altering irrational thoughts and unwanted behaviors.

Evolutionary psychology
An evolutionary psychology explanation is that increased anxiety serves the purpose of increased vigilance regarding potential threats in the environment as well as increased tendency to take proactive actions regarding such possible threats. This may cause false positive reactions but an individual with anxiety may also avoid real threats. This may explain why anxious people are less likely to die due to accidents. There is ample empirical evidence that anxiety can have adaptive value. Within a school, timid fish are more likely than bold fish to survive a predator.

When people are confronted with unpleasant and potentially harmful stimuli such as foul odors or tastes, PET-scans show increased blood flow in the amygdala. In these studies, the participants also reported moderate anxiety. This might indicate that anxiety is a protective mechanism designed to prevent the organism from engaging in potentially harmful behaviors.

Social
Social risk factors for anxiety include a history of trauma (e.g., physical, sexual or emotional abuse or assault), bullying, early life experiences and parenting factors (e.g., rejection, lack of warmth, high hostility, harsh discipline, high parental negative affect, anxious childrearing, modelling of dysfunctional and drug-abusing behaviour, discouragement of emotions, poor socialization, poor attachment, and child abuse and neglect), cultural factors (e.g., stoic families/cultures, persecuted minorities including those with disabilities), and socioeconomics (e.g., uneducated, unemployed, impoverished although developed countries have higher rates of anxiety disorders than developing countries). 
A 2019 comprehensive systematic review of over 50 studies showed that food insecurity in the United States is strongly associated with depression, anxiety, and sleep disorders. Food-insecure individuals had an almost 3 fold risk increase of testing positive for anxiety when compared to food-secure individuals.

Gender socialization
Contextual factors that are thought to contribute to anxiety include gender socialization and learning experiences. In particular, learning mastery (the degree to which people perceive their lives to be under their own control) and instrumentality, which includes such traits as self-confidence, self-efficacy, independence, and competitiveness fully mediate the relation between gender and anxiety. That is, though gender differences in anxiety exist, with higher levels of anxiety in women compared to men, gender socialization and learning mastery explain these gender differences.

Treatment

The first step in the management of a person with anxiety symptoms involves evaluating the possible presence of an underlying medical cause, the recognition of which is essential in order to decide the correct treatment. Anxiety symptoms may mask an organic disease, or appear associated with or as a result of a medical disorder.

Cognitive behavioral therapy (CBT) is effective for anxiety disorders and is a first line treatment. CBT appears to be equally effective when carried out via the internet. While evidence for mental health apps is promising, it is preliminary.

Psychopharmacological treatment can be used in parallel to CBT or can be used alone. As a general rule, most anxiety disorders respond well to first-line agents. Such drugs, also used as anti-depressants, are the selective serotonin reuptake inhibitors and serotonin-norepinephrine reuptake inhibitors, that work by blocking the reuptake of specific neurotransmitters and resulting in the increase in availability of these neurotransmitters. Additionally, benzodiazepines are often prescribed to individuals with anxiety disorder. Benzodiazepines produce an anxiolytic response by modulating GABA and increasing its receptor binding. A third common treatment involves a category of drug known as serotonin agonists. This category of drug works by initiating a physiological response at 5-HT1A receptor by increasing the action of serotonin at this receptor. Other treatment options include pregabalin, tricyclic antidepressants, and moclobemide, among others.

Anxiety is considered to be a serious psychiatric illness that has an unknown true pervasiveness due to affected individuals not asking for proper treatment or aid, and due to professionals missing the diagnosis.

Prevention
The above risk factors give natural avenues for prevention. A 2017 review found that psychological or educational interventions have a small yet statistically significant benefit for the prevention of anxiety in varied population types.

Pathophysiology
Anxiety disorder appears to be a genetically inherited neurochemical dysfunction that may involve autonomic imbalance; decreased GABA-ergic tone; allelic polymorphism of the catechol-O-methyltransferase (COMT) gene; increased adenosine receptor function; increased cortisol.

In the central nervous system (CNS), the major mediators of the symptoms of anxiety disorders appear to be norepinephrine, serotonin, dopamine, and gamma-aminobutyric acid (GABA). Other neurotransmitters and peptides, such as corticotropin-releasing factor, may be involved. Peripherally, the autonomic nervous system, especially the sympathetic nervous system, mediates many of the symptoms. Increased flow in the right parahippocampal region and reduced serotonin type 1A receptor binding in the anterior and posterior cingulate and raphe of patients are the diagnostic factors for prevalence of anxiety disorder.

The amygdala is central to the processing of fear and anxiety, and its function may be disrupted in anxiety disorders. Anxiety processing in the basolateral amygdala has been implicated with expansion of dendritic arborization of the amygdaloid neurons. SK2 potassium channels mediate inhibitory influence on action potentials and reduce arborization.

See also 
List of people with an anxiety disorder

References

External links 

 

 
Emotions